A One Man Game is a 1927 American silent Western film directed by Ernst Laemmle and written by William Berke. The film stars Fred Humes, Fay Wray, Harry Todd, Clarence Geldart, Norbert A. Myles and Lotus Thompson. The film was released on January 30, 1927, by Universal Pictures.

Cast    
 Fred Humes as Fred Hunter
 Fay Wray as Roberta
 Harry Todd as Sam Baker
 Clarence Geldart as Jake Robbins 
 Norbert A. Myles as Stephen Laban 
 Lotus Thompson as Millicent Delacey
 William Malan as John Starke
 Julia Griffith as Mrs. Delacey

References

External links
 

1927 films
1927 Western (genre) films
Universal Pictures films
Films directed by Ernst Laemmle
American black-and-white films
Silent American Western (genre) films
1920s English-language films
1920s American films